Hellions are an Australian punk rock band from Sydney, formed in 2013 after the break up of The Bride, in which drummer Anthony Caruso, bassist turned vocalist Dre Faivre and guitarist/vocalist Matt Gravolin continued under a different moniker. They have released four studio albums; their third, Opera Oblivia, was nominated for the 2016 ARIA Award for Best Hard Rock/Heavy Metal Album. Rue their fourth studio album was released on 19 October 2018 via UNFD.

Members

Current
Anthony Caruso – drums, percussion, backing vocals (2013–present)
Dre Faivre – lead vocals (2013–present)
Josh Campiao – guitars, backing vocals (2015–present)

Former
Matthew Gravolin – lead guitar, vocals (2013–2019)
Lewis Usher – rhythm guitar, backing vocals (2013–2014)
Dylan Stark – bass, backing vocals (2013–2014)
Chris Moretti – bass, backing vocals (2015–2017)

Timeline

Discography

Studio albums

Singles

Music videos

Awards and nominations

AIR Awards
The Australian Independent Record Awards (commonly known informally as AIR Awards) is an annual awards night to recognise, promote and celebrate the success of Australia's Independent Music sector.

|-
| AIR Awards of 2017
| Opera Oblivia
| Best Independent Hard Rock, Heavy or Punk Album
| 
|-

ARIA Awards 
The Australian Recording Industry Association Music Awards is an annual series of awards nights celebrating the Australian music industry, put on by the Australian Recording Industry Association.

References

2013 establishments in Australia
Australian punk rock groups
Musical groups established in 2013
Musical quartets
Musical groups from Sydney